Miriam Schneid-Ofseyer (December 9, 1923 – September 20, 2012) was an Israeli-Canadian poet and educator.

Born in Lutsk, Soviet Union, Schneid immigrated with her family to Hebron in 1926. Her father was murdered in the 1929 massacre, and she (then five years old) and her mother were severely injured. They moved to Jerusalem, where she afterwards graduated from the Mizrahi Teachers' Seminary and the Hebrew University. She later emigrated to Toronto.

Publications

 
 
 
 
  With Naftali (Otto) Schneid.
  Translation of Lilakh.
 
 
  Translation of Yeraḥ ha-devosh.
  Translation of Li-leyovah be-ahavah.
  Translation of Li-leyovah be-ahavah.

References

1923 births
2012 deaths
People from Lutsk
20th-century Canadian Jews
20th-century Canadian poets
20th-century Israeli poets
Canadian women poets
Israeli emigrants to Canada
Israeli women poets
Jewish Canadian writers
Jewish poets
Jewish women writers
Writers from Toronto